Ischemic bowel may refer to:

Ischemic colitis, ischemia of the large bowel
Mesenteric ischemia, ischemia of the small bowel